Mary Ajami (Arabic: ماري عجمي) (1888 – December 25, 1965) was a Syrian feminist and pioneering Arabic-language writer who launched the first women's periodical in Western Asia and North Africa called Al Arus (Arabic: the Bride).

Biography 

Ajami was born to a large Greek Orthodox Christian family in 1888 and raised in Damascus, modern-day Syria. Her father was Abdallah al-Ajami, a prominent Damascene landowner, businessman and influential figure of the church, whilst her mother was a woman of Greek descent. She spent her formative years in Damascus, where she received an education from Irish and Russian missionary schools, before studying nursing and graduating from the Syrian Protestant College in Beirut in 1906. Even while she was a student at the Syrian Protestant College, she began teaching as a visiting teacher in Zahlé, Lebanon.  

After graduation, she began teaching in Port Said, Egypt. The following year she moved to a school in Alexandria, Egypt before returning to her native Damascus to teach English to students attending the Russian military school there.

Journalist 
She was a writer frequently publishing her work under the pseudonym of Layla (her mother's name) for fear of reprisals.

Ajami began freelance writing about social and political topics for Muhammad Kurd Ali's weekly newspaper Al Muqtabas and in 1910 began her own periodical Al 'Arus (Araic: the Bride), which was the first Syrian publication to defend women's rights, which ran for 11 years. As the editor-in-chief, she was able to employ a few educated girls to serve on its editorial board, although she had the young women sign their journalist contributions under an assumed name for their protection from harassment in Syria's male-dominated society. Ajami's first editorial in the new periodical was a declaration, "a manifesto for Syria's emerging feminist movement, dedicating her work... "To those who believe that in the spirit of women in the strength to kill the germs of corruption, and that in her hand is the weapon to rend the gloom of opposition, and in her mouth the solace to lighten human misery."She personally raised the necessary funds to support the journal, which soon became recognized as "one of the highest quality periodicals in the Arab world." While the journal was a rousing success among the country's female educated elite, it was scorned by conservative Muslim readers who condemned its messages and sought to abolish it.During World War I, the journal suspended its publication and Ajami wrote editorials for the Egyptian newspaper al-Ahrar (Free Patriots), and al-Islah (Reform), an Arabic newspaper based in Buenos Aires, Argentina.
She was fiercely opposed to the Ottoman Empire, especially after 1915 when authorities in Beirut, executed Ajami's fiancé, Petro Pauli, for criticizing the occupying military regime of Sultan Mohammed Rashad V.

From 1918 to 1920 she headed the Christian Women's Club, an organization aimed at promoting Arabism amongst the Christians of Damascus and Beirut.

In 1919, she officially restarted publication of al-Arus, but not without controversy. In 1920, religious leaders demanded that Ajami be brought to trial for promoting heresy by publishing a story supporting civil marriage.

Suffrage campaigner 
In 1920, after the Ottoman Empire collapsed, she founded of the Damascus Women's Literary Club and spearheaded the movement to give women the right to vote, going directly to King Faysal I, the first post-Ottoman Syrian ruler. In that same year, she established a weekly salon in her home that was well attended by both men and women who took that opportunity to discuss politics, philosophy and religious affairs. Her salon was groundbreaking at the time, because allowing men and women to engage in discussions together was unheard of in Syria. In her own words, she described the salon's aim as "reviving female intelligentsia."

Ajami's successful career was tempered by elements of tragedy in her personal life. For many years, she longed to continue her studies abroad, but her father's death and the outbreak of war prevented her from doing so. Joseph T. Zeidan reminds us that her achievements "must be assessed in the light of formidable obstacles she encountered while struggling to keep her journal alive, not least of which were her father's attempts to persuade her to quit."

Later years 

Ajami was somewhat of an anomaly for her time, and like her more famous peer May Ziadeh, Ajami never married. She died on December 25, 1965.

Tributes 
Fares al-Khoury, the two-time prime minister of Syria, compared Ajami to her famous contemporary May Ziadeh (1886-1941) when he said in verse form,My friends take it from me, 

I can say that Mary Ajami

can match with May Ziadeh

For skill and ingenuity.

Selected publications 
Al-Majdaliyya al-Hasna''' (the Beautiful Magdelene) (1913)Mukhtarat min al-Sh'r'' (Selected Poems) (1944)

See also 

 Women's literary salons and societies in the Arab world
 The Arab Human Development Report:Towards the Rise of Women in the Arab World

References

External links

Members of the Greek Orthodox Church of Antioch
Syrian Christians
1888 births
1965 deaths
Syrian salon-holders
Syrian women poets
Syrian nationalists
American University of Beirut alumni
Writers from Damascus
Syrian suffragists
Syrian women journalists	
20th-century Syrian women writers
20th-century Syrian writers
Syrian magazine founders